Martina Navratilova was the defending champion but did not compete at the Dow Classic in 1990.

Zina Garrison won in the final against Helena Suková, 6–4, 6–1.

Seeds
The top eight seeds receive a bye into the second round.

  Zina Garrison (Champion)
  Helena Suková (final)
  Rosalyn Fairbank-Nideffer (semifinals)
  Nathalie Tauziat (semifinals)
  Gigi Fernández (quarterfinals)
  Gretchen Magers (second round)
  Anne Smith (quarterfinals)
  Larisa Savchenko-Neiland (quarterfinals)
 n/a
  Laura Golarsa (third round)
  Amanda Coetzer (first round)
  Lori McNeil (third round)
  Angélica Gavaldón (first round)
  Betsy Nagelsen (third round)
  Nana Miyagi (first round)
  Claudia Kohde-Kilsch (third round)

Qualifying

Draw

Finals

Top half

Section 1

Section 2

Bottom half

Section 3

Section 4

References
 1990 Dow Classic Draws
 ITF Tournament Page
 ITF singles results page

Dow Classic - Singles
Singles